Schul may refer to:
 Robert "Bob" Keyser Schul (born 1937), American long distance runner
 Zikmund Schul (1916, Chemnitz - 1944), a Jewish German composer

See also 
  means synagogue
 Polnische Schul
 Schiffschul
 Synagoga Kopszer Szul w Dyneburgu
 Synagoga Altnaje Szul w Rydze
 Marta Litynska, née Shul' (born 1949)
 Jan Szul
 F. W. Putzgers Historischer Schul-Atlas
 Schuler, Shuler, Schuller
 Schulmann, Schulman, Shulman
 Schulberg
 Schulhof, Schulhofer
 Schule
 Schull
 Schuls

References 

Yiddish words and phrases
Jewish surnames
Yiddish-language surnames